Fatih Üçüncü (born 14 March 1989 in Samsun, Turkey) is a male wrestler from Turkey competing in the 55 kg division of Greco–Roman style. He is a member of Ankara ASKİ SK since 2008.

Üçüncü began with wrestling in 2000.

He won the bronze medal at the 2012 European Wrestling Championships in Belgrade, Serbia and repeated his same success at the 2013 European Wrestling Championships held in Tbilisi, Georgia.

References

External links
 

1989 births
Sportspeople from Samsun
Living people
European Games competitors for Turkey
Wrestlers at the 2015 European Games
Turkish male sport wrestlers
Mediterranean Games silver medalists for Turkey
Competitors at the 2013 Mediterranean Games
Mediterranean Games medalists in wrestling
European Wrestling Championships medalists
21st-century Turkish people